The Osney Ditch is a side channel of the River Thames at Oxford, England. It is one of the principal watercourses in west Oxford.

The ditch leaves Bulstake Stream just east of Binsey Lane and then rejoins the main stream of the Thames south of Osney. It flows under Botley Road and forms the western side of Osney Island. The ditch passes just to the west of St Frideswide's Church south of Botley Road and east of Ferry Hinksey Road.

See also
 Tributaries of the River Thames

References 

Geography of Oxford
Rivers of Oxfordshire
0OsneyDitch